Brunswick Mum (or Mumia), was originally an alcoholic beer from Brunswick in Germany, which ranged from weak to strong depending on the brewing method. One of the first black beers recorded in history.

History
Mum originated in the Late Middle Ages. The composition gave the beer a long shelf life that allowed a wide distribution; Mum became the most important export from Brunswick and, in the early modern period was shipped to places such as India and the Caribbean. The drink is still sold in Brunswick where since autumn 2008, for the first time in about 200 years, it is produced in alcoholic variants.

Notes

References
 Christian Basilius: Die Mumme-Fibel der Mumme H. Nettelbeck K.G. Geschichte(n) seit 1390. Braunschweig 1999.
 
 Andreas Döring: Wirth! Nochmal zwo Viertel Stübchen! Braunschweiger Gaststätten & Braunschweiger Bier damals. Braunschweig 1997.
 Anna Klie: Brunswyksche Mumme. Braunschweig 1898.
 Heinrich Mack: Zur Geschichte der Mumme. Insbesondere des Mummehandels im 17. Jahrhundert. in: Braunschweigisches Magazin. Zwißler, Wolfenbüttel 1911,17.
 Ernst A. Roloff: Heimatchronik der Stadt Braunschweig. Archiv für Deutsche Heimatpflege, Köln 1955.
 Gerd Spies: Das Mummetor. Miszellen. Bd 25. Städtisches Museum Braunschweig, Braunschweig 1976.

External links 

 Artikel Braunschweigische Mumme (1733) und Mumme (1739) in Zedler’s Universal-Lexicon
 „Oeconomischen Encyclopädie“ von 1773
 Offizielle Website der Nettelbeck KG, der letzten Mumme-Brauerei
 Julius Stinde: Zwei Veteranen des Bierstaates (1880) über die Mumme und die Goslarer Gose
 Artikel über die Herstellung der Braunschweiger Mumme 
"Braunschweiger Speis und Trank" inklusive des Loblieds auf die Mumme auf www.GiBS.info
 Offizielle Website „Braunschweiger Mumme-Meile“
Mum in Chambers' Cyclopaedia, 4th Edition (1741)

History of Brunswick
Types of beer
Culture in Braunschweig